Giannis Christopoulos (born 12 November 1972) is a Greek professional football manager and former player.

Managerial career

Greece
The long journey began coaching 14 years ago, somewhere in 1999, when the 27 years old coach, finished as a player ( played in Kalamata, Pamisos Messini)  and started a new chapter in his career as coach . The academies of Kalamata were those who first opened their doors to welcome the young coach, who after several interviews and resumes, got the approval of the former president of Kalamata Stavros Papadopoulos, who was quite satisfied with the curriculum of the young coach, who had already made his own passage as coach in small groups and academies in Levski Sofia as part of his studies.  In the beginning he trained the youth teams, then worked as an assistant coach in the senior teams. In the beginning of 2012–13 season George Christovassilis, president of PAS Giannina gave the opportunity to the young coach to take over for first time as head coach. Giannis Christopoulos lead the team qualified for the Greek Superleague Play-Offs.

Ukraine
On 17 June 2013, he signed a one-year deal with SC Tavriya Simferopol in the Ukrainian Premier League.

Managerial statistics

Honours

Individual
Super League Greece Manager of the Year: 2012–13 with PAS Giannina.

References

External links
 

1972 births
Living people
Greek footballers
Greek football managers
PAS Giannina F.C. managers
SC Tavriya Simferopol managers
Aris Limassol FC managers
Kalamata F.C. managers
Platanias F.C. managers
Levadiakos F.C. managers
Ukrainian Premier League managers
Footballers from Kalamata
Greek expatriate football managers
Expatriate football managers in Ukraine
Expatriate football managers in Cyprus
Expatriate football managers in Sweden
Greek expatriate sportspeople in Ukraine
Greek expatriate sportspeople in Cyprus
Greek expatriate sportspeople in Sweden
Association footballers not categorized by position